ANM Faizul Mahi, (1939 – 14 December 1971) born in the district of Feni, was a Bengali educationist.

Education and career
Mahi joined the Institute of Education and Research in 1968 after obtaining Ed.D. (doctorate in education) and then soon became senior lecturer. He was known to his friends as a progressive personality. He was not vocal compared to many of his colleagues in the university but very much dedicated to the cause of 1971 Bangladesh liberation war that was going on from March to December, helping the freedom fighters from within keeping a low profile, a very difficult job indeed. But he could not keep secret his real identity from the watchful eyes of the collaborators some of whom happened to be his colleagues within IER.

Death
Notorious Al Badr, the paramilitary force of Pakistani military picked him up on 14 December 1971 from his home.

On 3 November 2013, Chowdhury Mueen-Uddin, a Muslim leader based in London, and Ashrafuz Zaman Khan, based in the US, were sentenced in absentia after the court found that they were involved in the abduction and murders of 18 people – nine Dhaka University teachers including Faizul Mahi, six journalists and three physicians – in December 1971.

Gallery

See also
 1971 Bangladesh atrocities

References

1939 births
1971 deaths
Bangladeshi murder victims
People murdered in Bangladesh
People killed in the Bangladesh Liberation War